Vaginulus buergueri is a species of land slug, a terrestrial pulmonate gastropod mollusk in the family Veronicellidae, the leatherleaf slugs.

Distribution
This species occurs in:
 The island of Dominica.

References

Veronicellidae
Gastropods described in 1914